The South African Heritage Resources Agency (SAHRA) is the national administrative body responsible for the protection of South Africa's cultural heritage. It was established through the National Heritage Resources Act, number 25 of 1999 and together with provincial heritage resources authorities is one of the bodies that replaced the National Monuments Council.

Heritage Listings in South Africa
 List of heritage sites in South Africa
 National heritage sites of South Africa
 Provincial heritage site (South Africa)
 Heritage objects (South Africa)

Associated legislation
 National Heritage Resources Act, Act 25 of 1999

See also

 National Monuments Council (South Africa and Namibia)
 National heritage sites (South Africa)
 Heritage objects (South Africa)
 List of heritage sites in South Africa
 Provincial heritage resources authority
 Amafa aKwaZulu-Natali
 Heritage Western Cape
 Northern Cape Heritage Resources Authority

References

External links
 National Heritage Resources Act, number 25 of 1999, in online pdf format
 
 Website of the South African Heritage Resources Agency
 Searchable database of declared sites on SAHRIS

Provincial Heritage Resources Authorities:
 Western Cape - Heritage Western Cape
 KwaZulu Natal - Amafa aKwaZulu-Natali
 Free State - Heritage Free State
 Eastern Cape - Eastern Cape Provincial Heritage Resources Authority
 Mpumalanga - Mpumalanga Provincial Heritage Resources Authority
 Limpopo - Limpopo Heritage Resources Authority
 North West - North West Provincial Heritage Resources Authority
 Northern Cape - Ngwao-Boswa Jwa Kapa Bokone
 Gauteng - Provincial Heritage Resources Authority Gauteng

 
Government agencies of South Africa
Heritage registers in South Africa
Heritage registers